The Château du Clos Lucé (or simply Clos Lucé), formerly called Manoir du Cloux, is a large château located in the center of Amboise, in the department of Indre-et-Loire, in the Centre-Val de Loire region of France. It is located in the natural Val de Loire (formerly called Touraine) region. Built by Hugues d'Amboise in 1471, the palace has known several famous owners such as the French king Charles VIII and Leonardo da Vinci. Clos Lucé is 500 metres from the royal Château d'Amboise, to which it is connected by an underground passageway.

King Charles VIII bought the home from Etienne Le Loup in 1490 and during this time it became known as the ‘summer house’, housing French royalty. After a few decades Francis I gave it to Leonardo da Vinci when he invited him to live in France in 1516. The aging polymath lived his last years in this house, until his death on 2 May 1519.

Thanks to its famous owners, this house today ranks as a ‘historical monument’ and therefore is protected from demolition or reconstruction. After 1855 it became a well-known museum about Leonardo da Vinci's life, work and memory, which was put together and directed by The Saint-Bris family, the present owners of the property.

History

The Middle-Ages and The Renaissance Period 
The house was built by Hugues d'Amboiseon on a Gallo-Roman foundation. It was organized around an octagonal tower, within which a spiral staircase stood. Around the spiral staircase were two buildings that had two floors each. The elegant facade made with pink bricks and whites stones was typical of the XVth century. Formally called Château de Cloux, the building was property of the Chateau D’Amboise, and the lands of Lucé were annexed to the castle from the XIVth century. At the time, the manor was surrounded by fortifications; only one still remains, the watchtower.

For a short time the building housed religious people of the abbaye of Moncé, as they resided in the building until 1471. The Clos Lucé was then sold on 26 May to Etienne le Loup, who was Louis XI Counselor and Amboise beadle. The building was in ruin when Etienne acquired the lands, he restored it giving it the famous visual aspect that we see today - a square tower with Gothic windows that created a towering and well protected medieval fortress.

Ownership by royalty

On the 2 July 1490, Charles VIII bought the castle from Etienne Le Loup for 3500 golden ecus and transformed the medieval stronghold into a more comfortable and habitable home. He also built a chapel for his wife, Anne of Brittany who lived at the Clos-Lucé until she left for the royal castle of Blois. It became known as ‘the summer house’ for the French royalty for 200 years.

The oratory was a Gothic made of chalk stones (tuffeau) and decorated with murals painted by Leonardo's followers: there is an Annunciation, a Last Judgement and a final painting called Virgo Lucis above the door, which may have gave its name to the castle. The museum also includes a copy of 'The oratory was built in 1492 by Charles VIII for his wife, Anne of Brittany. It was a chapel of the Gothic movement made with chalk stones (tuffeau) and decorated with murals painted by Leonardo's disciples: there is an Annunciation, a Last Judgement and a final painting called Virgo Lucis above the door, which may have gave its name to the castle. The museum also includes a copy of the Mona Lisa, painted in 1654 by Ambroise Dubois.

Between 1509 and 1515 the Castle housed Charles IV Duke of Alençon and Marguerite of Valois. The duke then sold the castle to Louise of Savoy, Regent of France, who took up residence and raised her two children the Duke of Angoulême who was destined to become the next king of France, Francis I and Marguerite de Navarre, intellectual and writer of the Heptaméron.

Leonardo da Vinci’s years at the Clos Lucé 

In 1516 at aged 64 Leonardo da Vinci left Rome and traveled through Italy, armed with his sketchbooks and 3 of his most famous paintings: Mona Lisa, The Virgin and Child, with St. Anne and St. John the Baptist. They are now conserved in the Musée du Louvre, Paris. His disciples Francesco Melzi and Salaì followed him throughout his travels, as did his servant, Batista of Vilanis.

Benvenuto Cellini wrote that king Francis I gave Leonardo da Vinci a pension of 700 gold ecus, as well as buying his artwork allowing him to live and work in the Clos Lucé. Leonardo da Vinci was appointed ‘The first painter, engineer and architect of the King’.
Leonardo da Vinci was enthusiastic and productive during his years at the Clos Lucé. He worked on numerous projects, organized feasts for the court of Amboise, and even drew the famous “Double Spiral Staircase” of the Château de Chambord. He also spent time on other projects, one of them consisting of designing the perfect city of Romorantin. In this, Leornardo Da Vinci wanted to dig a canal to connect two rivers allowing easier trade. He is still considered as one of the most renowned artists of his time.

On the 10 October 1517, he was visited by the Cardinal Luigi d’Aragona, who was so impressed by his artwork that he described them in his Itinerario, as “rare perfection”. These include his three most famous pieces of work : The Mona Lisa, The Virgin and Child, with St. Anne and St John the Baptist.

Leonardo organized a feast in the Château du Clos Lucé on the 19 June 1518, to thank The French King Francis I for his multiple gifts and generosity.
There were a lot of similarities with the feast that Leonardo organised in Milan on the 13 January 1490 (Festa del paradisio, play of Bernardo Bellincioni): there was a complex machinery to impress the guests, which referred to the movements of the celestial bodies thanks to a blue canvas which symbolized the heavens where ran planets, stars, the Sun, the Moon and the twelve zodiac signs.

Despite the rumors that he would die in the king's arms Leonardo da Vinci passed away in his room at the Clos Lucé on the 2 May 1519. He left his books, drawings, sketches and manuscripts to his beloved apprentice, Francesco Melzi.

From the Renaissance to Modern times 
After Leonardo's death, Louise of Savoy took over the Chateau, however this did not last too long as Philibert Babou of the Bourdaisière and his wife succeed her in 1523. The Chateau was then taken over by Michel of Gast, who was the Guards Captain under King Henri III of France and became the owner after the murder of the Cardinal of Guise by the king himself, in 1583.

In 1632, the marriage of Antoine d’Amboise and Michel de Gast's granddaughter brought the Chateau back in the hands of House Amboise. During the French Revolution the castle was miraculously spared and remained in the Amboise family until 1832 - it was then designed as a historical monument by the list of 1862.

Finally, the castle became the property of the Saint-Bris family on 30 July 1855, after ownership by the Amboise family who protected the property, by then, named Clos Lucé instead of Manoir du Cloux, during the French Revolution. The chateau was opened to the public in 1954 by Hubert and Agnès Saint Bris. A major restoration was completed in the 1960s. In 1979, Jean Saint Bris continued his parents' work.  As of 2019, president of the family enterprise was François Saint Bris.

The castle today 

The castle is set in the heart of a 7-hectares park, crossed by the Amasse, a tributary of the Loire. The facade of the house is made with pink bricks and white stones and has remained almost unaltered since the Renaissance in which an old rampart walkway still remains. Within the castle, remain the rooms of Leonardo da Vinci, Anne of Brittany and Marguerite of Navarre, including the oratory and council rooms. The first floor bedrooms were restored in 2011 with period details and artifacts. There is a restaurant on site.

According to the Smithsonian, restoration over the years was extensive: "the mansion has been restored to the way it appeared during Leonardo’s stay there, including his bedroom, his basement studio, the original frescoes on the walls and the high stone hearth in the kitchen".

In the basement, there are 40 models that IBM made from Leonardo's sketches and drawings, including a helicopter, as well as some 3D animations about the Italian master's inventions, allowing the public to see them working. In the park is a pigeon house from the middle of XVth century built by Etienne le Loup, Amboise beadle that can shelter up to a thousand birds. In 2003, Jean Saint-Bris set up an educational and cultural course in the park of the Clos Lucé with several sound terminals and impressive machines inspired from Leonardo's mind. The open-air museum in the garden, with its forty translucent canvasses, houses full-size models of some Da Vinci inventions, including a chariot, a multi-barrelled gun, an aerial screw and a revolving bridge.

During 2019, the 500th anniversary of his death, Amboise held many events celebrating Da Vinci's life, some at Clos Lucé. The number of visitors to the chateau in 2019 was estimated as 500,000, a 30% increase over the typical annual number. Da Vinci is special to the French, according to François Saint Bris. "He lived a long time in France and he died here ... And 'La Joconde' [Mona Lisa] is in France. So ... for us, he's a little French."

Gallery

See also
 Châteaux of the Loire Valley
 House of Amboise

References

Further reading

 

 Carmine Mastroianni, Leonardo da Vinci da Roma ad Amboise. Gli ultimi anni di un genio del Rinascimento in fuga dall'Italia, Efesto, 2019. ;

External links
 
 Official web site of the Clos Lucé
 Leonardo da Vinci in France
 Clos Lucé Education
 

Houses completed in the 15th century
Buildings and structures in Indre-et-Loire
Houses in France
Local museums in France
Historic house museums in Centre-Val de Loire
Technology museums in France
Museums in Indre-et-Loire